Horace Harris (May 11, 1911 – July 1986) was an American Negro league outfielder in the 1930s.

A native of Mathews, Alabama, Harris played for the Montgomery Grey Sox in 1932. He died in Montgomery, Alabama in 1986 at age 75.

References

External links
 and Seamheads

1911 births
1986 deaths
Montgomery Grey Sox players
Baseball outfielders
Baseball players from Alabama
People from Montgomery County, Alabama
20th-century African-American sportspeople